The Westminster Trained Bands were a part-time military force established in 1572, recruited from residents of the City of Westminster. As part of the larger London Trained Bands, they were periodically embodied for home defence, such as during the 1588 Spanish Armada campaign. Although service was technically restricted to London, the Trained Bands formed a major portion of the Parliamentarian army in the early years of the First English Civil War. After the New Model Army was established in April 1645, they returned to their primary function of providing security for the palaces of Westminster and Whitehall. Following the 1660 Stuart Restoration, the City of London Militia Act 1662 brought them under the direct control of the Crown, with the Trained Bands becoming part of the British Army.

Early History
The English militia was descended from the Anglo-Saxon Fyrd, the military force raised from the freemen of the shires under command of their Sheriff. It continued under the Norman kings, notably at the Battle of the Standard (1138). The force was reorganised under the Assizes of Arms of 1181 and 1252, and again by King Edward I's Statute of Winchester of 1285.

The legal basis of the militia was updated by two Acts of 1557 covering musters and the maintenance of horses and armour. The county militia was now under the Lord Lieutenant, assisted by the Deputy Lieutenants and Justices of the Peace (JPs). The entry into force of these Acts in 1558 is seen as the starting date for the organised county militia in England.

Trained Bands

Although the militia obligation was universal, it was clearly impractical to train and equip every able-bodied man, so after 1572 the practice was to select a proportion of men for the Trained Bands, who were mustered for regular training. The City of London and the Liberties of Westminster and the Tower Hamlets all fell within the boundaries of the County of Middlesex but had their own militia organisations: the difference was effectively between rural and suburban parishes of Middlesex. The Armada Crisis in 1588 led to the mustering of the trained bands in April, when the Westminster contingent consisted of men from the following wards and parishes:
 City of Westminster
 St Giles-in-the-Fields
 St Martin-in-the-Fields
 High Holborn
 Gray's Inn Lane
 St Clement Danes
 The Savoy Parish with the Strand

William Fleetwood of Ealing in Middlesex was 'Colonel and Chief Captain' of the company, which consisted of 150 pikemen and 300 calivermen. The trained bands were put on one hour's notice in June and called out on 23 July as the Armada approached. They were quickly stood down once the danger had passed

Under the Commonwealth and Protectorate the militia received pay when called out, and operated alongside the New Model Army to control the country. During the Worcester campaign of the Third English Civil War in 1651, the Middlesex Militia were ordered to rendezvous at St Albans while the LTBs remained guarding London.

Middlesex Militia

After the Restoration of the Monarchy, the English Militia was re-established by the Militia Act of 1661 under the control of the king's lords-lieutenant, the men to be selected by ballot. This was popularly seen as the 'Constitutional Force' to counterbalance a 'Standing Army' tainted by association with the New Model Army that had supported Cromwell's military dictatorship.

The Middlesex Militia now included the Red Regiment of Westminster, the 'Blewe' (Blue) Regiment of Middlesex (within the environs of London) and the Westminster Troop of Horse, and these continued to at least 1728. The Militia was reformed in the 1750s, when a new Royal Westminster Militia was raised, which eventually became the 5th Battalion, Royal Fusiliers (City of London Regiment).

Uniforms & insignia
The flag of the Westminster Company in 1588 was described as 'Azure and Or panes cross Rouge in field argent chief', which is not heraldically correct but is interpreted to mean large squares in alternate blue and gold, with a cross of St George on a white band across the top.

The Trained Bands were apparently not issued with uniforms, their regimental names being derived from the colours of their company flags or 'ensigns'. The Westminster Liberty Regiment, or Red Regiment, carried red ensigns with the seniority of the captains indicated by a number of silver stars.

Similarly, the Westminster Auxiliaries were known as the 'Yellow Auxiliaries' from their ensigns by 1644; earlier (under Col Washbourne) the regiments may have carried blue ensigns. Seniority was marked by flames issuing from the corner of the Cross of St George in the canton: one for the Sergeant Major, two for the 1st Captain, etc.

See also
 Trained Bands
 Middlesex Militia
 Royal Westminster Militia

Footnotes

Notes

References

 John Adair, Cheriton 1644: The Campaign and the Battle, Kineton: Roundwood, 1973, ISBN 0-900093-19-6.
 Ian F.W. Beckett, Wanton Troopers: Buckinghamshire in the Civil Wars 1640–1660, Barnsley:Pen & Sword, 2015, ISBN 978-1-47385-603-5.
 Lindsay Boynton, The Elizabethan Militia 1558–1638, London: Routledge & Keegan Paul, 1967.
 Lt-Col Alfred H. Burne & Lt-Col Peter Young, The Great Civil War: A Military History of the First Civil War 1642–1646, London: Eyre & Spottiswoode, 1959/Moreton-in-Marsh, Windrush Press, 1998, ISBN 1-900624-22-2.
 C.G. Cruickshank, Elizabeth's Army, 2nd Edn, Oxford: Oxford University Press, 1966.
 Mark Charles Fissel, The Bishops' Wars: Charles I's campaigns against Scotland 1638–1640, Cambridge: Cambridge University Press, 1994, ISBN 0-521-34520-0.
 Wilfred Emberton, Skippon’s Brave Boys: The Origin, Development and Civil War Service of London’s Trained Bands, Buckingham: Barracuda, 1984, ISBN 0-86023190-9.
 Sir John Fortescue, A History of the British Army, Vol I, 2nd Edn, London: Macmillan, 1910.
 J.B.M. Frederick, Lineage Book of British Land Forces 1660–1978, Vol I, Wakefield: Microform Academic, 1984, ISBN 1-85117-007-3.
 Col George Jackson Hay, An Epitomized History of the Militia (The Constitutional Force), London:United Service Gazette, 1905/Ray Westlake Military Books, 1987 ISBN 0-9508530-7-0.
 Richard Holmes, Soldiers: Army Lives and Loyalties from Redcoats to Dusty Warriors, London: HarperPress, 2011, ISBN 978-0-00-722570-5.
 John Kenyon, The Civil Wars of England, London: Weidenfeld & Nicolson, 1988, ISBN 0-297-79351-9.
 Lt-Col J.H. Leslie, ‘A Survey, or Muster, of the Armed and Trayned Companies in London, 1588 and 1599’, Journal of the Society for Army Historical Research, Vol 4, No 16 (April–June 1925), pp. 62–71.
 Lt-Col J.H. Leslie, 'The Defences of London in 1643', Journal of the Society for Army Historical Research, Vol 10, No 39a (April 1930), pp. 109–20.
  'JHL'  (Lt-Col J.H. Leslie?) & 'ACW', 'Tower Hamlets Militia', Journal of the Society for Army Historical Research, Vol 5, No 19 (January–March 1926), pp. 44–7.
 C.A. Linney-Drouet (ed), 'British Military Dress from Contemporary Newspapers, 1682–1799: Extracts from the Notebook of the Late Revd Percy Sumner', Journal of the Society for Army Historical Research, Vol, 78, No 314 (Summer 2000), pp. 81–101.
 F. W. Maitland, The Constitutional History of England, Cambridge: Cambridge University Press, 1931.
 Lawson Chase Nagel, The Militia of London, 1641–1649, PhD thesis, Kings College London, 1982.
 Stuart Reid, All the King's Armies: A Military History of the English Civil War 1642–1651, Staplehurst: Spelmount, 1998, ISBN 1-86227-028-7.
 Keith Roberts, London And Liberty: Ensigns of the London Trained Bands, Eastwood, Nottinghamshire: Partizan Press, 1987, ISBN 0-946525-16-1.
 David Sturdy, 'The Civil War Defences of London', London Archaeologist, Vol 2, No 13 (Winter 1975), pp. 334–8.
 Margaret Toynbee & Brig Peter Young, Cropredy Bridge, 1644: The Campaign and the Battle, Kineton: Roundwood, 1970, ISBN 0-900093-17-X.
 Dame Veronica Wedgwood, The King's War 1641–1647: The Great Rebellion, London: Collins, 1958/Fontana, 1966.

External sources
 Battlefields Trust
 British Civil Wars, Commonwealth & Protectorate, 1638–1660 (the BCW Project)

Trained Bands of England
Military units and formations in Middlesex
Military units and formations in the City of Westminster
Military units and formations of the English Civil War
Military units and formations established in 1572
Military units and formations disestablished in 1662